Skate4Cancer is a foundation created by Rob Dyer after losing his grandparents, mother and a friend to cancer.

Skate4Cancer is an advocacy group focused on knowledge sharing and early detection of cancers to improve survival rates.

Creation and Skateboard Marathons 
In 2004, Dyer skated over 8000 km from his hometown of Newmarket, Ontario to Los Angeles, California.

Four months prior to his skate, Dyer lost his paternal grandmother to stomach cancer. Shortly after, his maternal grandmother and mother died due to brain cancer. Shortly before his skate, a friend of his died from stomach cancer. Dyer and the Skate4Cancer team finished the skate in 5 months.

In 2008, Dyer decided he would do another cross country skate, this time focusing on Canada. He left Vancouver, British Columbia in June 2008. They finished their second skate on a late November night in Halifax, NS.

Dyer and the Skate4Cancer traveled to New Zealand and Australia in early 2010 for another Skate4Cancer Marathon. After finishing their marathon across New Zealand, they begun their marathon in Australia.

Almost in Adelaide, Dyer was hit by a car while skating. Dyer was able to call for help via a cell phone, and received medical treatment at a local hospital. Dyer had a groin injury as a result of the accident. Dyer and Skate4Cancer decided to return to Canada, and planned to finish the skate in the following year. Dyer and Skate4cancer skated a total of 3667 km before returning home.

In 2011, Dyer and Skate4Cancer skated across France after the end to the Australia marathon. That same year, with help from clothing retailer West 49, Skate4Cancer raised over $100,000. Proceeds from the sales of Skate4Cancer T-shirts went to Wellspring.ca to help families dealing with cancer.

Skate4Cancer has toured with bands such as RocketRocketShip, The Deftones, City and color, Alexisonfire, Silverstein, The Devil Wears Prada, and Shad. Skate4Cancer also attended Warped Tour as a vendor, as well as SCENE fest to spread education and awareness materials centered on cancer prevention.

2009 Ashley Kirilow scam 

In 2009, Skate4Cancer was victim of a scam by Ashley Kirilow, who had shaved her hair and starved herself to appear as a chemotherapy patient. Kirilow contacted Skate4Cancer, who flew her to Disney World after stating it was her final wish. Skate4Cancer is one of numerous other groups in Toronto that were victims of similar scams from Kirilow and her scam organization, Change for a Cure.

Skate4Cancer sent out a statement after allegations came forward about Kirilow's scam, stating: "For your peace of mind, Skate4Cancer has no formal or informal affiliation to Change For A Cure. There have been no jointly held events or fundraising initiatives. Skate4Cancer's involvement with Ms. Kirilow was based solely on fulfilling what the organization believed to be a legitimate final wish from a terminally ill individual."

The Cure is Knowledge tour 
Established as an interactive campaign which encourages healthy living and an active lifestyle, focused on cancer prevention while remaining attainable and relevant to a youth demographic. Skate4Cancer and The Cure is Knowledge tour was successful in part because of their frequent collaboration with festivals and musicians, such as Warped Tour, NXNE, All Time Low, SHAD and Lights.

Since 2006, Skate4Cancer organized their own live music event in Winnipeg.

In the fall of 2013, Skate4Cancer opened their first pop-up shop in Toronto, where clothing was sold to support Wellspring.ca and movember.com. Over $20,000 was raised as a result of the fundraiser.

References

Cancer organizations based in Canada